The 2014–15 Armenian Premier League season was the twenty-third since its establishment. FC Banants are the defending champions.

Teams

Personnel and sponsorship

Managerial changes

League table

Results
The league was played in four stages. The teams played four times with each other, twice at home and twice away, for a total of 28 matches per team.

First half of season

Second half of season

Top goalscorers

See also
 2014–15 Armenian First League
 2014–15 Armenian Cup

References

External links
 ffa.am
 soccerway.com
 uefa.com
 rsssf.com

Armenian Premier League seasons
Arm
1